Mediavia longistriga is a species of snout moth in the genus Mediavia. It was described by Schaus in 1922. It is found from Guatemala to South America.

It was moved to the genus Mediavia in 1993.

References

Moths described in 1922
Epipaschiinae